Atsuyarovo (Athöyär) is a rural locality (a village) in Sukkulovsky Selsoviet, Dyurtyulinsky District, Bashkortostan, Russia. The population was 118 as of 2010. There are 2 streets.

Geography 
Atsuyarovo is located 13 km south of Dyurtyuli (the district's administrative centre) by road. Yukalikulevo is the nearest rural locality.

References 

Rural localities in Dyurtyulinsky District